This is a list of Latvian football transfers in the 2012 summer transfer window by club. Only transfers of the Virsliga and 1. līga are included.

All transfers mentioned are shown in the external links at the bottom of the page. If you wish to insert a transfer that isn't mentioned there, please add a reference.

Latvian Higher League

Ventspils 

In:

Out:

Liepājas Metalurgs 

In:

Out:

Daugava Daugavpils 

In:

Out:

Skonto 

In:

Out:

Jūrmala 

In:

Out:

Jelgava 

In:

Out:

Gulbene 

In:

Out:

Daugava Riga 

In:

Out:

METTA/LU 

In:

Out:

Spartaks 

In:

Out:

Latvian First League

Skonto-2 

In:

Out:

Liepājas Metalurgs-2 

In:

Out:

Rīgas Futbola skola 

In:

Out:

Varavīksne 

In:

Out:

Ventspils-2 

In:

Out:

Rēzekne 

In:

Out:

Daugava-2 Daugavpils 

In:

Out:

Valmiera 

In:

Out:

Auda 

In:

Out:

Tukums 2000 

In:

Out:

Jelgava-2 

In:

Out:

Ilūkste 

In:

Out:

METTA-2/Salaspils 

In:

Out:

Spartaks-2 

In:

Out:

References

External links 
 futbolavirsliga.lv 
 sportacentrs.com 

2012
Latvia
Football
transfers